is a railway station in the city of Hanamaki, Iwate Prefecture, Japan, operated by East Japan Railway Company (JR East), with a freight terminal operated by the Japan Freight Railway Company (JR Freight).

Lines
Hanamaki-Kūkō Station is served by the Tōhoku Main Line, and is located 505.7 kilometers from the starting point of the line at Tokyo Station.

Station layout
The station has an island platform and a single side platform, connected to the station building by a footbridge. The station is staffed and has a Midori no Madoguchi ticket office.

Platforms

History
It was renamed Hanamaki-Kūkō Station on 13 March 1988. The station was absorbed into the JR East network upon the privatization of the Japanese National Railways (JNR) on 1 April 1987.

Passenger statistics
In fiscal 2018, the station was used by an average of 650 passengers daily (boarding passengers only).

Surrounding area
 Hanamaki Airport
 Tōhoku Expressway

See also
 List of railway stations in Japan

References

External links

  

Railway stations in Iwate Prefecture
Tōhoku Main Line
Railway stations in Japan opened in 1932
Hanamaki, Iwate
Stations of East Japan Railway Company
Stations of Japan Freight Railway Company
Airport railway stations in Japan